Camp Creek  is a stream in Polk, Marion and Jasper counties, in the U.S. state of Iowa.

Camp Creek was named from the fact a first settler camped there before deciding to stay.

See also
List of rivers of Iowa

References

Rivers of Jasper County, Iowa
Rivers of Marion County, Iowa
Rivers of Polk County, Iowa
Rivers of Iowa